Willie Joe Leen is a former hurler from Ballyheigue, County Kerry. He played with the Ballyheigue county championship winning teams of 1996,1997, and 2000. He also played with the Kerry intercounty team win a National League Div 2 medal in 2001.

References

Kerry inter-county hurlers
Ballyheigue hurlers
Living people
Year of birth missing (living people)